Poulad Castle is a historical castle located in Nur County in Mazandaran Province, The longevity of this fortress dates back to the Seljuk dynasty.

References 

Castles in Iran
Seljuk castles